Mahdi Araghi (1930 – 26 August 1979) was a founder of Fadayan-e Islam. He and a friend had participated in Hassan-Ali Mansur's terror, and he was kept in prison during the Shah's regime until the Iranian Revolution. After the revolution he was in charge of Qasr Prison, the prison from which he had recently been freed. He was assassinated by the Forghan group on 13 August 1979.

References 

1930 births
1979 deaths
Islamic Coalition Party politicians
Central Council of the Islamic Republican Party members
Islamic Nations Party members
Fada'iyan-e Islam members
People assassinated by the Furqan Group
Burials at Fatima Masumeh Shrine